Marcel Guillouet (14 February 1898 – 8 April 1973) was a French athlete. He competed in the men's long jump at the 1924 Summer Olympics.

References

External links
 

1898 births
1973 deaths
Athletes (track and field) at the 1924 Summer Olympics
French male long jumpers
Olympic athletes of France
Place of birth missing